Kelsey Hogan is an American women's basketball coach, and current head coach of the University of New Hampshire women's basketball team.

Playing career
Hogan played high school basketball for four years at Nashua High School North. She was the first player for the team to score 1,000 points in her career, ending with 1,032. She was selected to the All-State team each of her four seasons and earned all-academic team honors in her junior year.

Hogan played four full seasons at New Hampshire. In her freshman year, 2008–09, she only played in three games. In the game against Long Island in November, she suffered a season-ending injury. As a result of this injury she was granted a redshirt season for 2009–10.

Hogan was named to the America East all rookie team and her first full freshman year 2010–11. She was named a co-captain of her team three times over her career. In her senior year, she was named to the America East all-conference first team.

Over her career she scored 1,181 points, which at the time was the 10th best for UNH. She made 62 three-pointers, which placed her number four among all UNH players, and accounted for 375 assists, good enough for third place. Her career free throw percentage of 80.7 was the best ever recorded by a UNH player at that time, and stands currently as the second best ever.

New Hampshire stats
Source:

Coaching career

Hogan joined Maureen Magarity's staff as an assistant coach shortly after her graduation in May 2014. She continued as an assistant coach until being named associate head coach in 2019. When Magarity was named the new head coach for Holy Cross, New Hampshire promoted Hogan to the position of head coach.

Head coaching record 
Source:

NCAA DI

References

External links
 Official Biography, New Hampshire Wildcats

Year of birth missing (living people)
Living people
American basketball coaches
New Hampshire Wildcats women's basketball players
New Hampshire Wildcats women's basketball coaches